Pauls Hole is a small harbor lying along the east side of Rongé Island just south of Cuverville Island, off the west coast of Graham Land. The name was probably given by whalers operating in the area prior to 1921–22.

References

Ports and harbours of Graham Land
Danco Coast